Garrett Oliver (born July 29, 1962) is an American brewer and beer author from New York City. Since 1994, he has worked as the brewmaster at the Brooklyn Brewery.

Early life
Oliver grew up in Hollis, Queens to a father who enjoyed hunting and cooking. Oliver studied filmmaking at Boston University, and as a student organized concerts for bands such as R.E.M., The Ramones, The English Beat, and The Gun Club. After graduation, he spent a year stage-managing bands at the University of London. He then traveled in Europe, sampling beers in countries such as Belgium, West Germany, and Czechoslovakia. After returning to the United States in 1983, he began homebrewing, working for HBO and a New York law firm.

Brewing career
In 1989, Oliver became an apprentice brewer at the Manhattan Brewing Company. In 1993, he was appointed brewmaster of the company, which closed and reopened twice in the early 90s. In 1994, he left Manhattan to become brewmaster at the Brooklyn Brewery, a position he has held since. He has also become a partner in the company.

Oliver has an interest in beer pairing and cooking with beer, having written several books on the subjects, including 2003's The Brewmaster's Table: Discovering the Pleasures of Real Beer with Real Food. This interest has led him to become involved in the Slow Food movement. He was also the editor of the 2011 Oxford Companion to Beer, and has served as a judge at the Great American Beer Festival.

In May 2012 Garrett Oliver was honoured by the Institute of Brewing and Distilling through the Beer Academy as an 'International Beer Champion' and was made an 'Honorary Beer Academy Sommelier'. He was the first (with Bill Taylor) to be given this title from the British organisation that educates and certifies beer sommeliers.

References

Bibliography

Further reading

External links

Garrett Oliver on LinkedIn

African-American non-fiction writers
American non-fiction writers
American brewers
Beer writers
Boston University College of Communication alumni
Living people
People from Hollis, Queens
1962 births
Brewery workers
James Beard Foundation Award winners
21st-century African-American people
20th-century African-American people